Apatema mediopallidum is a moth of the family Autostichidae. It is found on Corsica, Sardinia, Sicily, Malta, Crete, Cyprus and in Portugal, Spain, France, Italy, Austria, Hungary, Albania, the Czech Republic, Romania, Bulgaria, North Macedonia, Greece, Turkey and on the Canary Islands.

The wingspan is about 12 mm. The forewings are very pale ochreous, mottled and shaded with fuscous. The hindwings are shining pale grey.

References

External links
  Images representing Apatema mediopallidum  at Consortium for the Barcode of Life

Moths described in 1900
Apatema
Moths of Europe
Moths of Asia